The second assembly of the Croatian Parliament was constituted on September 7, 1992 with mandates divided to 138 representatives after the August 2, 1992 elections.

Parliamentary officials
The presidents of the parliament (often also called the speaker in English) were Stjepan Mesić (HDZ) from September 7, 1992 to May 24, 1994 and Nedjeljko Mihanović (HDZ) from May 24, 1994 to November 28, 1995.

Representatives in the second assembly

Nedjeljko Mihanović
Goran Granić
Žarko Domljan
Vladimir Šeks
Milan Đukić
Ljubomir Antić
Mato Arlović
Luka Bebić
Vladimir Bebić
Ivan Bedeničić
Barbara Bešenić
Borislav Bešlić
Snježana Biga-Friganović
Srećko Bijelić
Vicencije Biuk
Petar Bosnić
Dalibor Brozović
Dražen Budiša
Nikola Bulat
Željko Bušić
Boris Buzančić
Juraj Buzolić
Slavko Canjuga
Vladimir Cvitanović
Savka Dabčević-Kučar
Dino Debeljuh
Slavko Degoricija
Tomislav Pavao Duka
Anto Đapić
Šime Đodan
Jakob Eltz
Ferenc Farago 
Goranko Fižulić
Katarina Fuček
Anđelko Gabrić
Krešimir Glavina
Marino Golob
Vladimir Gotovac
Franjo Gregurić
Ivan Herak
Stjepan Herceg 
Vilim Herman
Dragan Hinić
Želimir Hitrec
Ivan Hodalić
Ivan Hranjec
Ivan Jakovčić
Bolta Jalšovec
Tomo Jelić
Rade Jovičić
Marijan Jurić
Perica Jurić 
Zvonimir Jurić
Živko Juzbašić
Boris Kandare
Ante Karić
Martin Katičić
Miroslav Kiš
Ante Klarić
Ivan Kolak
Milan Kovač
Anton Kovačev
Božo Kovačević
Ivan Kovačić
Zlatko Kramarić
Petar Kriste
Drago Krpina
Milivoj Kujundžić
Ante Kutle
Marko Kvesić
Anto Lovrić
Mira Ljubić-Lorger
Mirko Mađor
Marcel Majsec
Elio Martinčić
Zdenko Matešić
Nediljko Matić
Ivan Matija
Joso Medved
Ivan Mesić
Stjepan Mesić
Adam Meštrović
Slavko Meštrović
Ivan Milas
Marin Mileta
Milanka Opačić
Josip Pankretić
Dobroslav Paraga
Branimir Pasecky
Ivić Pašalić
Jurica Pavelić
Stanislav Pavić
Darko Pavlak
Vlatko Pavletić
Veselin Pejnović
Đuro Perica
Božidar Petrač
Miloš Petrović
Vera Pivčević-Stanić
Davorin Pocrnić
Niko Popović
Ante Prkačin
Vice Profaca
Ivan Rabuzin
Ivica Račan
Furio Radin
Jozo Radoš
Martin Sagner
Vedran Sršen
Njegovan Starek
Milan Stojanović
Kazimir Sviben
Boris Šegota
Milovan Šibl
Ante Šimara
Ivo Škrabalo
Tomislav Šutalo
Mirko Tankosić
Boris Tepšić
Velimir Terzić
Branko Tinodi
Ivan Tolj
Nedeljko Tomić
Jozo Topić
Miko Tripalo
Gordana Turić
Mladen Vedriš
Mladen Vilfan
Antun Vrdoljak
Ivan Vrkić
Dario Vukić
Vice Vukojević
Josip Vusić
Franjo Zenko
Muhamed Zulić
Ratko Žabčić
Ante Žarkov

Sources

References

Lists of representatives in the modern Croatian Parliament by term
1990s in Croatia